Jaime Báez Stábile (born 25 April 1995) is a Uruguayan professional footballer who plays as a winger for Italian  club Frosinone.

Club career
Born in Montevideo, Báez started his career playing with Juventud. He made his professional debut during the 2012–13 season.

On 9 August 2018, Báez joined to Serie B club Cosenza on loan until 30 June 2019.

On 2 August 2019, he moved to Cosenza on a permanent basis, signing a three-year contract.

On 29 January 2021, Báez signed with Serie B club Cremonese.

On 13 January 2023, Báez  moved to Frosinone.

References

External links
 
 

1995 births
Living people
Footballers from Montevideo
Uruguayan footballers
Association football forwards
Uruguay under-20 international footballers
2015 South American Youth Football Championship players
Uruguayan Primera División players
Serie B players
Serie A players
Juventud de Las Piedras players
Defensor Sporting players
ACF Fiorentina players
U.S. Livorno 1915 players
Spezia Calcio players
Delfino Pescara 1936 players
Cosenza Calcio players
U.S. Cremonese players
Frosinone Calcio players
Uruguayan expatriate footballers
Uruguayan expatriate sportspeople in Italy
Expatriate footballers in Italy